Iva Shkodreva-Karagiozova (born September 21, 1971 in Samokov, Bulgaria) is a former Bulgarian biathlete. She competed at the 1992, 1994 and 2002 Winter Olympics.

References

1971 births
Living people
Bulgarian female biathletes
Olympic biathletes of Bulgaria
Biathletes at the 1992 Winter Olympics
Biathletes at the 1994 Winter Olympics
Biathletes at the 2002 Winter Olympics
Olympic medalists in biathlon
Biathlon World Championships medalists
People from Samokov
Sportspeople from Sofia Province
20th-century Bulgarian women